The 2018 World's Strongest Man was the 41st edition of the World's Strongest Man competition held in Manila, Philippines from April 28 to May 6, and was won by Hafþór Júlíus Björnsson the first Icelander since Magnús Ver Magnússon in 1996 to win the title. Mateusz Kieliszkowski of Poland finished second and four-time winner Brian Shaw of the United States third. 

The qualifying phase lasted until May 1 while the finals took place on May 5th and 6th while various World's Strongest Man events were hosted within and outside Metro Manila. Among the venues were the Quirino Grandstand in Rizal Park; Intramuros, Manila; Bonifacio Global City in Taguig; and the University of the Philippines campus in Diliman, Quezon City. Events outside Metro Manila were hosted in Bataan, Corregidor Island, Coron Island, Davao City, and Tagaytay.

Heat Results
The qualifying heats consisted of six events. After five events, the competitor with the highest score qualifies for the final. The competitors in second and third place take part in the final event, the Atlas Stones, with the winner progressing.

Heat 1

Heat 2

Heat 3

Heat 4

Heat 5

Finals Events Results

Event 1: Frame Carry
 Weight: 
 Course Length: 
 Time Limit: 60 seconds

Event 2: Car Deadlift
 Weight:  for repetitions
 Time Limit: 60 seconds

Event 3: Max Overhead Press
 Starting Weight:

Event 4: Bus Pull
 Weight: 
 Course Length: 
 Time Limit: 60 seconds

Event 5: Loading Race
 Weight:  anchor,  anvil,  keg,  sand bag, and a  safe 
 Course Length: 
 Time Limit: 75 seconds

Event 6: Atlas Stones
 Weight: 5 Atlas Stone series ranging from 
 Time Limit: 60 seconds

Final standings

References

External links

World's Strongest Man
2018 in Philippine sport
Sports in Metro Manila
International sports competitions hosted by the Philippines